KIAA0999 protein is a protein that in humans is encoded by the SIK3 gene.

References

Further reading 

 
 
 
 

EC 2.7.11